This is a list of people from the city of Greater Sudbury, Ontario, Canada. It includes people from all communities and nations within the current city boundaries.



A
 Eve Adams, politician
 Chuck Adamson, goaltender
 Alfons Adetuyi, film director (High Chicago, Love Jacked)
 Robert Adetuyi, screenwriter (Stomp the Yard)
 Al Arbour, NHL coach
 George Armstrong, NHL Hall of Famer
 Kelley Armstrong, author, creator of the Women of the Otherworld book series
 Brian Ashton, soccer player
 Larry Aurie, former captain of the Detroit Red Wings
 Marcel Aymar, musician

B
 John Baby, hockey player
 Robert Bain, politician
 Drew Bannister, hockey player
 Andy Barbe, hockey player
 Rick Bartolucci, politician
 Alex Baumann, Olympic gold medalist (1984)
 William S. Beaton, politician
 Jean Robert Beaulé, politician
 Rhéal Bélisle, politician
 Robert Charles Bell, author
 Richard E. Bennett, Mormon historian and author
 Christian Bernier, volleyball player
 Todd Bertuzzi, NHL hockey player
 Tyler Bertuzzi, NHL hockey player
 Larry Berrio, country musician
 Tyler Beskorowany, hockey player
 Silvio Bettio, hockey player
 Murray Biggar, politician
 Brian Bigger, politician
 Ryan Bishops, musician
 Hector "Toe" Blake, NHL player, coached eight Stanley Cup teams
 Al Blanchard, hockey player
 Sean Blanchard, hockey player
 Harry Bloy, politician
 Frank Blum, hockey player
 Michel Bock, historian and winner of the 2005 Governor General's Award for French language non-fiction
 Fred Boimistruck, hockey player
 Kerry Bond, hockey player
 Tessa Bonhomme, member of Team Canada women's hockey
 Raymond Bonin, politician
 Phillip Boudreault, boxer and biker
 Joe Bowen, Canadian sportscaster (Molson Leafs Hockey)
 Randy Boyd, hockey player
 Brian Bradley, hockey player
 Jim Bradley, politician
 Lysette Brochu, writer
 Mark Browning, musician
 Andrew Brunette, NHL player
 Cummy Burton, former NHL player with Detroit Red Wings; OHL alumni with Sudbury Wolves
 Jeffrey Buttle, figure skater

C
 Lorenzo Cadieux, historian
 Bryan Campbell, NHL and WHA hockey player
 Sterling Campbell, politician
 Lucien Campeau, cardiologist
 Robert Campeau, financier
 Patricia Cano, singer and actress
 Wayne Carleton, NHL and WHA hockey player 
 Robert Carlin, politician
 Randy Carlyle, NHL player, NHL coach
 Judy Feld Carr, humanitarian who rescued over 3,000 Jewish people from war-torn Syria in the 1970s and 1980s
 Susan Carscallen, figure skater
 Rita Celli, journalist
 Gene Ceppetelli, football player
 Marie Charette-Poulin, politician
 Diane Chase
 Ray Chénier, politician
 Margaret Christakos, poet
 Joe Cimino, politician
 Kevin Closs, singer-songwriter
 Francis Cochrane, politician
 Bob Cook
 Cindy Cook, children's entertainer and former host of Polka Dot Door
 James Cooper, politician
 Pedro Costa
 Sean Costello, author
 D'Arcy Coulson
 David Courtemanche, politician
 Gary Croteau
 Troy Crowder, hockey player
 Bud Cullen, politician

D
 Michel Dallaire, writer
 Jean-Marc Dalpé, dramatist and two-time winner of the Governor General's Award
 Gaston Demers
 Andrew Desjardins, NHL player with the Chicago Blackhawks
 Jacqueline Desmarais, billionaire
 Jean Noël Desmarais
 Louis Desmarais
 Paul Desmarais, businessman
 Paul Desmarais, Jr.
 Nancy Diamond, politician
 Robert Dickson, poet and winner of the 2002 Governor General's Award for French poetry
 Anne Ditchburn, ballet dancer, choreographer, and Golden Globe-nominated film actress
 Ron Duguay, NHL player
 Rand Dyck, academic

E
 Judy Erola, former federal cabinet minister and Member of Parliament
 Robert Esmie, Olympic gold medalist (1996)
 Jack Egers, NHL (Washington and New York Rangers)

F
 Joe Fabbro, politician
 Ronald Peter Fabbro, Roman Catholic Bishop
 Norman Fawcett, politician
 Peter Fenton, politician
 Bob Fitchner, WHA and NHL hockey player
 John Flesch, NHL hockey player
 Gerry Foley, NHL hockey player
 Marcus Foligno, OHL player; silver medalist at the 2011 World Junior Ice Hockey Championships
 Mike Foligno, NHL player, OHL coach
 Nick Foligno, NHL player
 Dave Fortier, NHL and OHL player
 Marion Foster, mystery writer
 Stephen Fournier, politician
 Jim Fox, NHL hockey player
 Jason Frederick, composer and musician
 Pete Friesen, guitarist and songwriter with Alice Cooper and The Almighty
 Doug Frith, politician

G
 Aaron Gavey, hockey player
 France Gélinas, MPP Nickel Belt politician
 Welland Gemmell, former MPP
 Gaétan Gervais, professor, co-designer of the Franco-Ontarian flag
 Eddie Giacomin, hockey player
 Frank Giustra,  business executive, particularly successful in the mining and filmmaking industries, philanthropist
 Gerald S. Graham, imperial and naval historian; University of London professor
 Gil Grand, country musician
 Claude Gravelle, MP, Nickel Belt politician

H
 Matthew Heiti, writer
 Keith Hennessy, San Francisco-based dancer, choreographer, and performance artist, regarded as a pioneer of queer and AIDS-themed expressionist dance
 Tracy Horgan, professional curler on the World Curling Tour, three time provincial junior champion
 Andrew Hyatt, country singer

I

ImPuppetChampion- Infulencer with over 54K followers on TikTok

https://www.tiktok.com/@impuppetchampion?_t=8ah6R2BHDD3&_r=1

 Joe Ironstone (1898–1972), professional ice hockey player

J
 James Jerome, former federal Member of Parliament and Speaker of the House of Commons
 David Johnston, former Governor General of Canada
 Rebecca Johnston, Olympic gold medalist for Canada's women's hockey team

K
 Devon Kershaw, competitive cross-country skier
 Jordan Kilganon, basketball slam dunker
 Gary Kinsman, sociologist and professor at Laurentian University
 Bryden Gwiss Kiwenzie, musician

L
 Marc Laforge, NHL player
 Yvon Lambert, NHL player
 François Lamoureux, musician
 Pierre Lamoureux, musician
 Floyd Laughren, former Member of Provincial Parliament and Ontario Minister of Finance
 Paul Lefebvre, politician
 Mark Leslie, writer, author of Spooky Sudbury
 Dave Lowry, NHL player
 Viviane Lapointe , Politician

M
 Derek MacKenzie, NHL player
 Kate Maki, singer-songwriter
 Troy Mallette, player
 Robert Marinier, playwright and television writer
 Diane Marleau, Liberal politician
 Elie Martel, NDP politician
 Shelley Martel, NDP politician
 Jake Mathews, country musician
 Bruce Mau, designer
 Marc Mayer, art curator and director of the National Gallery of Canada
 Melchior Mbonimpa, writer
 Mirl "Red" McCarthy, sportsman and coach
 Dale McCourt, NHL player
 Peter McGillivray, opera singer
 Ken McGowan, politician
 Ross McLaren, filmmaker and artist
 Pierre R. Morisset, 32nd Canadian Surgeon General
 Sharon Murdock, former MPP

N
 Angela Narth, children's author
 Roger Nash, poet

O
 Terry O'Reilly, CBC Radio host, author

P
 B. P. Paquette, film director, screenwriter, producer, and academic
 Robert Paquette, singer-songwriter
 Stéphane Paquette, francophone singer-songwriter and actor (Météo+)
 Eli Pasquale, member of Canada's national basketball team at the 1988 Summer Olympics
 Michael Persinger, cognitive neuroscience researcher and professor at Laurentian University
 Herb Petras, Major-General (Ret.), Canadian Forces
 Reg Plummer, Olympic field hockey player
 Marie-Paule Poulin, Senator and president of the Liberal Party of Canada
 Joel Prpic NHL player

R
 Alma Ricard, businesswoman and philanthropist, Officer of the Order of Canada
 F. Baxter Ricard, media proprietor
 Alex J. Robinson, country musician
 Jeff Rock, pastor of the Metropolitan Community Church of Toronto
 John Rodriguez, politician, former MP for Nickel Belt and former mayor of the city
 Kimberly Rogers, woman whose death in 2001, while under house arrest for a disputed welfare fraud conviction, became a major political issue in Ontario
 Art Ross, NHL player
 Sam Rothschild (1899–1987), NHL player; first Sudburian to play on a Stanley Cup winning team; first Jewish hockey player in the NHL; nominated to the Canadian Curling Hall of Fame 
 Jeffrey Round, writer

S
 Marc G. Serré , Politician
 Frank St. Marseille, hockey player and coach
 Brian Savage, NHL player
 Sarah Selecky, writer
 Dan Seguin, NHL player
 Eddie Shack, NHL player
 Sandra Shamas, comedian
 Linda Sorgini, actress
 Irv Spencer, NHL player with the New York Rangers, Boston Bruins, and the Detroit Red Wings
 Frederick Squire, musician

T
 Dave Taylor, NHL player
 Lydia Taylor, rock singer
 Glenn Thibeault, politician
 Floyd Thomson, hockey player
 Jan Thornhill, children's writer and artist
 Alex Trebek, television host of Jeopardy!
 Jerry Toppazzini, hockey player
 Zellio Toppazzini, hockey player

W
 Thelma Walmsley, baseball player for the Racine Belles of the All-American Girls Professional Baseball League
 Kay Whitmore, NHL goalie

References

 
Greater Sudbury
Greater Sudbury